C# is a programming language. The following is a list of software programmed in it:

Banshee, a cross-platform open-source media player.
Beagle, a search system for Linux and other Unix-like systems.
Colectica, a suite of programs for use in managing official statistics and statistical surveys using open standards.
Chocolatey, an open source package manager for Windows.
Docky, a free and open-source application launcher for Linux.
FlashDevelop, an integrated development environment (IDE) for development of Adobe Flash websites, web applications, desktop applications and video games.
GameMaker Studio 2, a game engine with an editor written in C#
HandBrake, a free and open-source transcoder for digital video files.
KeePass, a free and open-source password manager primarily for Windows.
Low Orbit Ion Cannon (LOIC), an open-source network stress testing and denial-of-service attack application.
Lphant, a peer-to-peer file sharing client.
Microsoft Visual Studio, an integrated development environment (IDE) from Microsoft. Also programmed in C++.
MonoDevelop, an open source integrated development environment.
NMath, a numerical package for the Microsoft .NET Framework.
Open Dental, a dental practice management software.
OpenRA, a free remake of the classic Command & Conquer game.
osu!, a free and open-source (before freeware) Indie rhythm game with 4 modes for Microsoft Windows, Linux and macOS.
Paint.NET, a freeware raster graphics editor program for Microsoft Windows, developed on the .NET Framework..
Pinta, an open-source, cross-platform bitmap image drawing and editing program.
SharpDevelop, a free and open source integrated development environment (IDE) for the .NET Framework.
Windows Installer XML (WiX), a free software toolset that builds Windows Installer packages from XML.

 
 
Lists of software